The United Nations Relief and Works Agency for Palestine Refugees in the Near East (UNRWA) is a UN agency that supports the relief and human development of Palestinian refugees. UNRWA's mandate encompasses Palestinians displaced by the 1948 Palestine War and subsequent conflicts, as well as their descendants, including legally adopted children. As of 2019, more than 5.6 million Palestinians are registered with UNRWA as refugees.

UNRWA was established in 1949 by the UN General Assembly (UNGA) to provide relief to all refugees resulting from the 1948 conflict. It also provided relief to Jewish and Arab Palestine refugees inside the State of Israel following the 1948 conflict until the Israeli government took over responsibility for them in 1952. As a subsidiary body of the UNGA, UNRWA's mandate is subject to periodic renewal every three years; it has consistently been extended since its founding, most recently until 30 June 2023.

UNRWA employs over 30,000 people, most of them Palestinian refugees, and a small number of international staff. Originally intended to provide employment and direct relief, its mandate has broadened to include providing education, health care, and social services to its target population. UNRWA operates in five areas: Jordan, Lebanon, Syria, the Gaza Strip and the West Bank, including East Jerusalem; aid for Palestinian refugees outside these five areas is provided by United Nations High Commissioner for Refugees (UNHCR).

UNRWA is the only UN agency dedicated to helping refugees from a specific region or conflict. It is distinct from the UNHCR, established in 1950 as the main agency to aid all other refugees worldwide. Unlike UNRWA, UNHCR has a specific mandate to assist refugees in eliminating their refugee status by local integration in the current country, resettlement in a third country or repatriation when possible.

History and operations

Following the outbreak of the 1948 Arab-Israeli War, and the subsequent exodus of Palestinian Arabs, the United Nations General Assembly passed Resolution 212 (III), dated 19 November 1948, which established the UN Relief for Palestine Refugees (UNRPR) to provide emergency relief to Palestine refugees in coordination with other UN or humanitarian agencies. In response to the political aspects of the conflict, less than a month later the General Assembly adopted Resolution 194, creating the United Nations Conciliation Commission for Palestine (UNCCP), mandated to help achieve a final settlement between the warring parties, including facilitating "the repatriation, resettlement and economic and social rehabilitation of the refugees" in collaboration with the UNRPR. By that time, the conflict had displaced over 700,000 people.

Unable to resolve the "Palestine problem", which required political solutions beyond the scope of its mandate, the UNCCP recommended the creation of a "United Nations agency designed to continue relief activities and initiate job-creation projects" while an ultimate resolution was pending. Pursuant to this recommendation, and to paragraph 11 of Resolution 194, which concerned refugees, on 8 December 1949, the General Assembly adopted Resolution 302(IV), which established the United Nations Relief and Works Agency for Palestine Refugees in the Near East (UNRWA). The resolution was adopted and passed unopposed, supported by Israel and the Arab states, with only the Soviet bloc and South Africa abstaining.

UNRWA succeeded the UNRPR with a broader mandate for humanitarian assistance and development, and the requirement to function neutrally. When it began operations in 1950, the initial scope of its work was "direct relief and works programmes" to Palestine refugees, in order to "prevent conditions of starvation and distress… and to further conditions of peace and stability". UNRWA's mandate was soon expanded through Resolution 393(V) (2 December 1950), which instructed the agency to "establish a reintegration fund which shall be utilized ... for the permanent re-establishment of refugees and their removal from relief". A subsequent resolution, dated 26 January 1952, allocated four times as much funding on reintegration than on relief, requesting UNRWA to otherwise continue providing programs for health care, education, and general welfare.

Definition of refugee 
UNRWA has developed its own working definition of "refugee" to allow it to provide humanitarian assistance. Its definition does not cover final status.

Palestine refugees are "persons whose regular place of residence was Palestine during the period 1 June 1946 to 15 May 1948, and who lost both home and means of livelihood as a result of the 1948 conflict."

The Six-Day War of 1967 generated a new wave of Palestinian refugees who could not be included in the original UNRWA definition. Since 1991, the UN General Assembly has adopted an annual resolution allowing the 1967 refugees within the UNRWA mandate. UNRWA's "mandate" is not a single document but the sum of all relevant resolutions and requests of the General Assembly. While focused on Palestine refugees, it also extends to persons displaced by "the 1967 and subsequent hostilities" and, occasionally, to a broader cross-section of the local community. Several categories of persons have long been registered as eligible to receive UNRWA services although not "Palestine refugees".

The descendants of Palestine refugee males, including adopted children, are also eligible for registration as refugees.

Organisation and mandate
UNRWA is a subsidiary organ of the United Nations General Assembly, established pursuant to Articles 7(2) and 22 of the UN Charter. It is one of only two UN agencies that reports directly to the General Assembly. The scope and renewal of UNRWA's mandate is determined primarily by resolutions of the General Assembly; unlike other UN agencies, such as the World Health Organization or the Office of the UN High Commissioner for Refugees, it lacks a constitution or statute. The mandate may also be shaped by requests from other UN organs, such as the Secretary-General. The General Assembly passes a series of resolutions annually that address UNRWA's responsibilities, functions, and budget. As it is technically a temporary organisation, the agency's mandate is extended every three years; it was most recently renewed on 13 December 2019, extending until 30 June 2023.

UNRWA is led by a Commissioner-General—since 8 March 2020 Philippe Lazzarini of Switzerland—an Under-Secretary-General of the UN responsible for managing all of the agency's activities and personnel. The Commissioner-General selects and appoints all the agency's staff, pursuant to internal rules and regulations, and reports directly to the General Assembly. UNRWA's operations are organised into five fields—Jordan, Syria, Lebanon, West Bank, and Gaza—each led by a director, who is in charge of distributing humanitarian aid and overseeing general UNRWA operations. The agency's headquarters are divided between the Gaza Strip and Amman, with the latter hosting the Deputy Commissioner-General, currently Leni Stenseth of Norway, who administers departmental activities, such as education, healthcare, and finance.

UNRWA is the largest agency of the United Nations, employing over 30,000 staff, 99% of which are locally recruited Palestinians.

Advisory Commission 
Concurrent with the creation of UNRWA, the UN General Assembly established an Advisory Commission (AdCom) to assist the Commissioner-General in carrying out the Agency's mandate. Created with four members, the AdCom currently has 28 members and four observers. Membership is obtained via General Assembly resolutions, with all host countries of Palestinian refugees (Jordan, Syria, Lebanon) sitting on the commission, followed by the 24 leading donors and supporters of UNRWA. Palestine, the European Union, and the League of Arab States have had observer status since 2005, with the Organisation for Islamic Cooperation (OIC) joining as an observer in 2019.

Members of the AdCom, including the year they joined, are: Australia (2005), Belgium (1953), Brazil (2014), Canada (2005), Denmark (2005), Egypt (1949), Finland (2008), France (1949), Germany (2005), Ireland (2008), Italy (2005), Japan (1973), Jordan (1949), Kazakhstan (2013), Kuwait (2010), Lebanon (1953), Luxembourg (2012), Netherlands (2005), Norway (2005), Qatar (2018), Saudi Arabia (2005), Spain (2005), Sweden (2005), Switzerland (2005), Syria (1949), Turkey (1949), United Arab Emirates (2014), the United Kingdom (1949), the United States (1949).

The Advisory Commission is led by a chair and a vice-chair, representing a host country and a donor country, respectively. Each is appointed annually in June from among the Commission members according to the alphabetical rotation, serving for one year beginning 1 July. At each appointment, the Chair will alternate between a host and a donor country.

The AdCom meets twice a year, usually in June and November, to discuss important issues of UNRWA and develop a consensus-based guidance for the Commissioner-General. Additionally, members and observers convene more regularly through sub-committee meetings. The AdCom also conducts periodic field visits to UNRWA's area of operations.

Areas of operation
UNRWA services are available to all registered Palestine refugees living in its area of operations who need assistance. When UNRWA began operations in 1950, it was responding to the needs of about 700,000 Palestinian refugees. By 2019, some 5.6 million people were registered as eligible for UNRWA services.

UNRWA provides facilities in 59 recognized refugee camps in Jordan, Lebanon, Syria, the West Bank, and the Gaza Strip, and in other areas where large numbers of registered Palestine refugees live outside of recognized camps.

For a camp to be recognized by UNRWA, there must be an agreement between the host government and UNRWA governing the use of the camp. UNRWA does not itself run camps, has no police powers or administrative role, but simply provides services in the camp. Refugee camps, which developed from tent cities to dense urban dwellings similar to their urban surroundings, house around one-third of all registered Palestine refugees.

Funding
UNRWA's budget is set by the UN General Assembly and derives almost entirely from voluntary contributions by UN member states. It also receives some revenue from the regular UN budget, mostly for international staffing costs. In addition to its regular budget, UNRWA receives funding for emergency activities and special projects, such as in response to the Syrian civil war and the COVID-19 pandemic.

Historically, most of the agency's funds came from the United States and the European Commission; in 2019, close to 60 percent of its total pledge of $1.00 billion came from EU countries, with Germany being the largest individual donor. The next largest donors were the EU, United Kingdom, Sweden and the United Arab Emirates, followed by Saudi Arabia, France, Japan, Qatar, and the Netherlands. UNRWA also establishes partnerships with nongovernmental donors, including nonprofit "national committees" based in donor countries.

The voluntary nature of UNRWA funding has led to budgetary problems due to acute emergencies or political developments in donor countries. In 2009, officials spoke of a "dire financial crisis", including a funding shortfall of $200 million, in the wake of the Israeli offensive in Gaza In August 2018, the U.S. ceased its contributions, arguing that UNRWA's mandate should be reduced to the few hundred thousand Palestinians alive when the agency was created. The U.S. decision resulted in the loss of $300 million out of the $1.2 billion budget, contributing to an overall deficit of $446 million. The shortfall was covered with increased contributions from elsewhere.

In mid-2019, the Netherlands, Belgium and Switzerland temporarily suspended funding to UNRWA, citing ethics report that alleged mismanagement, corruption, and discrimination among the agency's leadership. In December 2019, the Netherlands restored its funding, increasing its donation by €6 million for 2019, to €19 million. The EU increased its contribution from €82 million ($92.2 million) by €21 million ($23.3 million), and Germany agreed to fund four new UNRWA projects, totaling €59 million ($65.6 million). Qatar increased its donation for Palestinians in Syria by $20.7 million, bringing the 2019 total to $40 million.

The funding situation for 2019 and beyond was discussed in April at a "Ministerial Strategic Dialogue" attended by representatives from Egypt, France, Germany, Japan, Kuwait, Norway, United Kingdom, the European External Action Service and the European Commission. At the annual meeting of the General Assembly that year, a high-level ministerial meeting was held regarding UNRWA funding. In July 2020, Commissioner-General Lazzarini warned that UNRWA's budget was "not sustainable", with shortfalls in four out of the five previous years, and funding at its lowest point since 2012.

According to the World Bank, for all countries receiving more than $2 billion in international aid in 2012, Gaza and the West Bank received a per capita aid budget over double the next largest recipient, at a rate of $495.

Operations
UNRWA provides a wide variety of social and humanitarian services, as determined by resolutions of the UN General Assembly. Since its initial establishment in 1949, its operations have expanded beyond immediate relief and social services; as of 2019, the bulk of its budget is spent on education (58 percent), followed by health care (15 percent), and general support services (13 percent).

Education programme 
Education is UNRWA's largest area of activity, accounting for more than half its regular budget and the majority of its staff. It operates one of the largest school systems in the Middle East, spanning 711 elementary and preparatory schools, eight vocational and technical schools, and two teacher training institutes. It has been the main provider of basic education to Palestinian refugee children since 1950. Free basic education is available to all registered refugee children, currently numbering 526,000. In the 1960s, UNRWA schools became the first in the region to achieve full gender equality, and a slight majority of enrolled students are female.

Half the Palestine refugee population is under 25. Overcrowded classrooms containing 40 or even 50 pupils are common. Almost three-quarters run on a double-shift system, where two separate groups of pupils and teachers share the same buildings, thus reducing teaching time. The school year is often interrupted by conflicts, prompting UNRWA to develop a special programme that provides education in emergency situations.

Per the longstanding agreement, UNRWA schools follow the curriculum of their host countries. This allows UNRWA pupils to progress to further education or employment holding locally recognised qualifications and complies with the sovereignty requirements of countries hosting refugees. Wherever possible, UNRWA students take national exams conducted by the host governments. Pupils at UNRWA schools often out-perform government school pupils in these state exams.

Not all refugee children attend UNRWA schools. In Jordan and Syria, children have full access to government schools and many attend those because they are close to where they reside.

Relief and social services programme
In Palestinian refugee society, families without a male breadwinner are often very vulnerable. Those headed by a widow, a divorcee, or a disabled father often live in dire poverty.

These families are considered "hardship cases", and constitute less than 6% of UNRWA beneficiaries.

UNRWA provides food aid, cash assistance, and help with shelter repairs to these families. In addition, children from special hardship case families are given preferential access to the Agency's vocational training centres, while women in such families are encouraged to join UNRWA's women's programme centres. In these centres, training, advice, and childcare are available to encourage female refugees' social development.

UNRWA has created community-based organizations (CBOs) to target women, refugees with disabilities, and to look after the needs of children. The CBOs now have their own management committees staffed by volunteers from the community. UNRWA provides them with technical and small sums of targeted financial assistance, but many have formed links of their own with local and international NGOs.

Health program
Since 1950, UNRWA has been the main healthcare provider for Palestinian refugees. Basic health needs are met through a network of primary care clinics, providing access to secondary treatment in hospitals, food aid to vulnerable groups, and environmental health in refugee camps.

Key figures for 2014 are:
 139 primary health facilities based in or near UNRWA settlements/camps
 3,107 health staff
 3,134,732 refugees accessing health services
 9,290,197 annual patient visits

The health of Palestine refugees has long resembled that of many populations in the transition from developing world to developed world status. However, there is now a demographic transition.

People are living longer and developing different needs, particularly those related to non-communicable diseases (NCDs) and chronic conditions that require lifelong care, such as diabetes, hypertension, and cancer. A healthy life is a continuum of phases from infancy to old age, each of which has unique, specific needs, and our programme therefore takes a 'life-cycle approach' to providing its package of preventive and curative health services.

To address the changing needs of Palestine refugees, we undertook a major reform initiative in 2011. We introduced the Family Health Team (FHT) approach, based on the World Health Organization-indicated values of primary health care, in our primary health facilities (PHFs).

The FHT offers comprehensive primary health care services based on wholistic care of the entire family, emphasizing long-term provider-patient relationships and ensuring person-centeredness, comprehensiveness, and continuity. Moreover, the FHT helps address intersectional issues that impact health, such as diet and physical activity, education, gender-based violence, child protection, poverty, and community development.

Medical services include outpatient care, dental treatment, and rehabilitation for the physically disabled. Maternal and child healthcare (MCH) is a priority for UNRWA's health program. School health teams and camp medical officers visit UNRWA schools to examine new pupils to aid early detection of childhood diseases. All UNRWA clinics offer family planning services with counselling that emphasises the importance of birth spacing as a factor in maternal and child health. Agency clinics also supervise the provision of food aid to nursing and pregnant mothers who need it, and six clinics in the Gaza Strip have their own maternity units. Infant mortality rates have for some time been lower among refugees than the World Health Organization's benchmark for the developing world.

UNRWA provides refugees with assistance in meeting the costs of hospitalisation either by partially reimbursing them, or by negotiating contracts with government, NGOs, and private hospitals.

UNRWA's environmental health services program "controls the quality of drinking water, provides sanitation, and carries out vector and rodent control in refugee camps, thus reducing the risk of epidemics."

UNRWA Microfinance Department
UNRWA's Microfinance Department (MD) aims to alleviate poverty and support economic development in the refugee community by providing capital investment and working capital loans at commercial rates. The programme seeks to be as close to self-supporting as possible. It has a strong record of creating employment, generating income, and empowering refugees.

The Microfinance Department is an autonomous financial unit within UNRWA, established in 1991 to provide microfinance services to Palestine refugees, as well as poor or marginal groups living and working in close proximity to them. With operations in three countries, the MD currently has the broadest regional coverage of any microfinance institution in the Middle East. Having begun its operations in the Palestinian territories, it remains the largest non-bank financial intermediary in the West Bank and Gaza.

Key figures, cumulative as of 2014 are:
 324,994 number of loans awarded
 US$368.1 million value of loans awarded
 33% youth outreach
 38% women outreach

Emergency operations
UNRWA takes a wide variety of actions to mitigate the effects of emergencies on the lives of Palestine refugees.

Particularly in the West Bank and the Gaza Strip (occupied Palestinian territory (oPt)) there has been ongoing intervention made necessary by, e.g., the 1967 War as well as the first and second intifadas, and the 2014 Gaza War.

Up until this point, the reconstruction work at Nahr el-Bared Palestine refugee camp in Lebanon has been the largest reconstruction project ever undertaken by UNRWA. This work began in 2009 and was made necessary when the camp was destroyed in the fighting between the Lebanese Armed Forces and Fatah al-Islam in 2007.

UNRWA evaluates the ongoing conflict in Syria as one of the most serious challenges ever. UNRWA supports Palestinian refugees, both those displaced within Syria and those who have fled to neighbouring countries within the UNRWA areas of operations.

Services range from supplying temporary shelter, water, food, clothing, and blankets to temporary job-creation and help for rebuilding. There is extensive cooperation with other international NGOs and local actors.

Infrastructure and camp/settlement improvement

About one-third of the 5 million refugees registered with the Agency live in recognized camps/settlements in Jordan, Lebanon, Syria, the West Bank, and the Gaza Strip. To date, UNRWA has participated in re-building 5,223 homes in Nahr al-Bared in Northern Lebanon and has initiated a recovery and reconstruction plan for Gaza including clinics, schools, and housing units. Special funding has been provided by Saudi Arabia, Japan, the Netherlands, and the United Arab Emirates.

Assessment and praise 
UNRWA has received praise from Nobel Peace laureates Mairéad Corrigan Maguire and Kofi Annan, the president of the UN General Assembly, former UN Secretary General Ban Ki-Moon, and representatives from the European Union, the United States, the Netherlands, Japan, Bangladesh, Cyprus, Jordan, Ghana, and Norway, among others. In 2007, the Permanent Representative of Norway to the United Nations described his country as a "strong supporter" of UNRWA, which acts as "a safety net" for the Palestine refugees, providing them with "immediate relief, basic services and the possibility of a life in dignity". The same day, the Representative of Iceland praised the agency's ability to "deliver substantial results" despite "often life-threatening conditions". 

In 2007, Israel expressed its continued support for UNRWA, noting that despite "concerns regarding the politicization" of the agency, the country supports its humanitarian mission.

Independent evaluations 
In 2011, UNRWA agreed to be assessed by the Multilateral Organisation Performance Assessment Network (MOPAN), a network of donor countries established to determine the organisational effectiveness of multilateral organisations. Based on four dimensions of organisational effectiveness—strategic management, operational management, relationship management, and knowledge management—MOPAN concluded that the agency performs adequately or well in most key indicators, particularly within strategic management. UNRWA responded to the result positively, noting that "many of the challenges highlighted in the report reflect challenges within most, if not all, multilateral organisations." In its most recent assessment in 2019, MOPAN commended UNRWA for continuing to increase the efficiency of its programmes, recognizing the agency as "competent, resilient and resolute".

Criticism and controversies
UNRWA has been accused of hiring known militants, perpetuating Palestinian dependency, demonizing Israel, and funneling money from Western governments to line the pockets of the Palestinian Authority and purchasing arms for terrorists. In 2004, Emanuel Marx and Nitza Nachmias pointed out that many criticisms of the agency corresponded to its age, "including symptoms of inflexibility, resistance to adjust to the changing political environment, and refusal to phase out and transfer its responsibilities to the Palestinian Authority".

In 2007, UNRWA initiated a reform program to improve efficiency. However, an internal ethics report leaked to Al Jazeera in 2019 alleged that, since 2015, the agency's senior management have consolidated power at the expense of efficiency, leading to widespread misconduct, nepotism, and other abuses of power among high ranking personnel. Responding to the Al Jazeera report, UNRWA issued a statement that both internal and external assessments of its management have been "positive":A recent report by an external group of experts (MOPAN) has just shown satisfactory (and at times very satisfactory) results of UNRWA's management and impact - which is particularly important for us during these times of intense political and financial pressure on the agency ... Similarly, the United Nations Board of Auditors recognized the quality of the management and leadership of UNRWA. Finally, the 2018 annual report recently presented by UNRWA's Department of Internal Oversight Services and Ethics Division - both independent bodies - to UNRWA's Advisory Commission (host countries and largest donors) confirmed these positive assessments. These reports testify to the strength of this Agency and are a matter of public record.

Mandate-related controversies

The mandate itself – including the definition of refugees

The UNRWA definition is meant solely to determine eligibility for UNRWA assistance. However, some argue it serves to perpetuate the conflict. Under General Assembly Resolution 194 (III), of 11 December 1948, other persons may be eligible for repatriation and/or compensation, but are not necessarily eligible for relief under the UNRWA's working definition.

Creating dependency rather than resettling refugees

Although UNRWA's Mandate is only Relief and Works, the Wall Street Journal Europe edition, published an op-ed by Asaf Romirowsky and Alexander H. Joffe in April 2011 saying that despite UNRWA's "purported goal, it is hard to claim that the UNRWA has created any Palestinian institutions that foster genuinely civil society. Ideally, the UNRWA would be disbanded and Palestinians given the freedom – and the responsibility – to build their own society."

The High Commission is mandated to help refugees get on with their lives as quickly as possible and works to settle them rapidly, most frequently in countries other than those they fled. UNRWA policy, however, states that the Palestinian Arabs who fled from Israel in the course of the 1948 war, plus all their descendants, are to be considered refugees until a just and durable solution can be found by political actors. UNRWA was specifically designed not to prescribe how the outcome of an agreement would take shape.

James G. Lindsay, a former UNRWA general counsel and fellow researcher for Washington Institute for Near East Policy published a report for WINEP in 2009 in which he criticized UNRWA practices. One of his conclusions was that UNRWA's failure to match UNHCR's success in resettling refugees "obviously represents a political decision on the part of the agency" and "seems to favor the strain of Palestinian political thought espoused by those who are intent on a 'return' to the land that is now Israel". However, UNRWA has never been given a mandate by the UN General Assembly to resettle refugees.

In 2010 John Ging, head of UNRWA Gaza had stated that he was disappointed in Linday's criticisms of UNRWA for failure to resettle refugees. Ging argued that there is "no basis to say that it is UNRWA's decision because our mandate is given to us. I agree that it is a political failure, but we don't set up the mandate, we are only the implementers".

In 2006, the UNRWA drew criticism from the US Congressmen Mark Kirk and Steven Rothman. Their letter, sent to the US Secretary of State Condoleezza Rice, stated in part: "After an exhaustive review of the UN's own audit, it is clear UNRWA is wrought by mismanagement, ineffective policies, and failure to secure its finances. We must upgrade UNRWA's financial controls, management, and enforcement of US law that bars any taxpayer dollars from supporting terrorists." UNRWA responded by showing the results of its school students in Syria and Jordan, who outperform their peers in host-government schools. UNRWA also mentioned the difficult conditions in which it operates: its refugee load increased much faster than its budget, while the tightening of the closure regime since the Second Intifada deeply affected the humanitarian situation in the former Israeli-occupied territories.

Senator Kit Bond (R-MO) said that UNRWA is an example of anti-Israel bias, and that Palestine refugees should be treated the same as all others with refugee status around the world.

In 2011, UNRWA spokesman Chris Gunness wrote:

In 2014, Bassem Eid, director of the Palestinian Human Rights Monitoring Group, accused UNRWA of perpetuating the refugee status of Palestinians, claiming that it "depends on death and the visual suffering of five million Palestinians" to justify its existence against the "best interests of the Palestinian refugees.' However, Eid's article was criticized for widespread inaccuracies and its almost verbatim paraphrasing of a "perennial anti-UNRWA" critic associated with Arutz Sheva, an Israeli media network considered to be right-wing and pro-Zionist.

In a statement in the Jerusalem Post, UNRWA rejected claims that it supports extremism and is anti-Israel, defending its record of improving efficiency and neutrality.

Execution-related controversies

Protection of Palestinian refugees

Asem Khalil, Associate Professor of Law at Birzeit University, and Dean of the Faculty of Law and Public Administration, has focused on human rights issues for Palestinians in host countries. After systematically documenting the human rights situation for Palestinians in Egypt, Jordan, Lebanon, and Syria, he concludes:

The point this approach is stresses, I believe, is not that UNRWA is not necessary or that Palestinian refugeehood is not unique and special, but rather that UNRWA is not currently capable of ensuring necessary protection for Palestinian refugees, and that host Arab states cannot use the uniqueness of Palestinian refugeehood to continue upholding discriminatory laws and policies towards Palestinian refugees. ...

The global financial crisis may result in decreasing international funds to UNRWA, and UNRWA may be pushed towards reducing its services. Such a scenario will be felt by Palestinian refugees in particular ways, seeing the absence of alternative sources of income and the restrictive laws and policies that exist in some host countries. UNRWA is a main service provider for Palestinian refugees in host countries. It provides jobs for thousands of refugees, education, health care, and various other services that are extremely valuable and necessary.

... The issue at stake here is that UNRWA is not enough, but the alternative is not the replacement of UNRWA by
UNHCR, rather the enhancement of the protection role of UNRWA, or the extension of protection mandate of UNHCR
to Palestinian refugees besides (not instead) existing agencies dealing with Palestinian refugees ...

Textbook controversy
In 2005 Nathan Brown, Professor of Political Science at George Washington University, wrote a short but comprehensive review article about textbooks used by Palestinians, focusing especially on changes starting in 1994.
The Oslo agreements resulted in the dismantling of the Israeli office responsible for censorship of textbooks. Administration of the education system for all Palestinian students in the West Bank and Gaza was taken over by the Palestinian Authority (PA). Other Palestinian schools administered by UNRWA in neighboring countries were unaffected. With the end of UNESCO monitoring of the books, UNRWA moved to develop supplementary materials to teach tolerance in the schools it administered.

It is the PA textbooks used in UNRWA schools in the West Bank, Gaza, and East Jerusalem that have been most extensively studied. The following discussions cannot be generalized to UNRWA schools elsewhere.

In the beginning, the PA used books from Jordan and Egypt. In 2000 it started issuing its own books. Nathan Brown investigated the differences between the new PA books and the ones being replaced

Regarding the Palestinian Authority's new textbooks, he states:

The new books have removed the anti-Semitism present in the older books while they tell history from a Palestinian point of view, they do not seek to erase Israel, delegitimize, it or replace it with the "State of Palestine"; each book contains a foreword describing the West Bank and Gaza as "the two parts of the homeland"; the maps show some awkwardness but do sometimes indicate the 1967 line and take some other measures to avoid indicating borders; in this respect they are actually more forthcoming than Israeli maps; the books avoid treating Israel at length but do indeed mention it by name; the new books must be seen as a tremendous improvement from a Jewish, Israeli, and humanitarian view; they do not compare unfavorably to the material my son was given as a fourth-grade student in a school in Tel Aviv".

Brown has pointed out that research into Palestinian textbooks conducted by the Centre for Monitoring the Impact of Peace in 1998 is misleading because it evaluates the old books; and in 2000, its research mixed old and new books.

In 2002, the United States Congress requested the United States Department of State to commission a reputable NGO to conduct a review of the new Palestinian curriculum. The Israel/Palestine Center for Research and Information (IPCRI) was thereby commissioned by the U.S. Embassy in Tel Aviv and the US Consul General in Jerusalem to review the Palestinian Authority's textbooks. Its report was completed in March 2003 and delivered to the State Department for submission to Congress. Its executive summary states: "The overall orientation of the curriculum is peaceful despite the harsh and violent realities on the ground. It does not openly incite against Israel and the Jews. It does not openly incite hatred and violence. Religious and political tolerance is emphasized in a good number of textbooks and in multiple contexts."

IPCRI's June 2004 follow-up report notes that "except for calls for resisting occupation and oppression, no signs were detected of outright promotion of hatred towards Israel, Judaism, or Zionism" and that "tolerance, as a concept, runs across the new textbooks". The report also stated that "textbooks revealed numerous instances that introduce and promote the universal and religious values and concepts of respect of other cultures, religions, and ethnic groups, peace, human rights, freedom of speech, justice, compassion, diversity, plurality, tolerance, respect of law, and environmental awareness".

However, the IPCRI noted a number of deficiencies in the curriculum.

The practice of 'appropriating' sites, areas, localities, geographic regions, etc. inside the territory of the State of Israel as Palestine/Palestinian observed in our previous review, remains a feature of the newly published textbooks (4th and 9th Grade) laying substantive grounds to the contention that the Palestinian Authority did not in fact recognize Israel as the State of the Jewish people. ...

The Summary also states that the curriculum asserts a historical Arab presence in the region, while:
The Jewish connection to the region, in general, and the Holy Land, in particular, is virtually missing. This lack of reference is perceived as tantamount to a denial of such a connection, although no direct evidence is found for such a denial." It also notes that "terms and passages used to describe some historical events are sometimes offensive in nature and could be construed as reflecting hatred of and discrimination against Jews and Judaism."

The US State Department has similarly raised concerns about the content of textbooks used in PA schools. In its 2009 Human Rights report, the U.S. State Department wrote that after a 2006 revision of textbooks by the PA Ministry of Education and Higher Education, international academics concluded that books did not incite violence against Jews but showed imbalance, bias, and inaccuracy. The examples given were similar to those given by IPCRI.

The Centre for Monitoring the Impact of Peace was re-constituted as The Institute for Monitoring Peace and Cultural Tolerance in School Education (IMPACT-SE) and seems to have improved the quality of its work. It has published a number of evaluations of PA textbooks The latest evaluation from 2011 concludes that the situation had not significantly improved and that there were in fact many examples of incitement to hatred and demonization of Israel – conclusions not widely shared by other experts.

In 2013 the results of a rigorous study, which also compared Israeli textbooks to PA textbooks, came out. The study was launched by the Council for Religious Institutions in the Holy Land, an interfaith association of Jewish, Christian, and Muslim leaders in Israel and the Occupied Territories. The study was overseen by an international Scientific Advisory Panel and funded by the United States State Department The Council published a report "Victims of Our Own Narratives? Portrayal of the 'Other' in Israeli and Palestinian School Books".

Most books were found to be factually accurate except, for example, through presenting maps that present the area from the river to the sea as either Palestine or Israel. Israeli schoolbooks were deemed superior to Palestinian ones with regard to preparing children for peace, although various depictions of the "other" as enemy occurred in 75% of Israeli, and in 81% of Palestinian textbooks.

The study praised both Israel and the Palestinian Authority for producing textbooks almost completely unblemished by "dehumanizing and demonizing characterizations of the other". Yet many troubling examples were given of both sides failing to represent each other in a positive or even adequate way. And the problem was more pronounced in PA textbooks.
 Neutral depictions of "the other" were found in 4% of Israeli, and 15% of Palestinian textbooks.
 Overall negative or very negative representations of Palestinians occurred 49% of the time in Israeli state school books (73% in Haredi school books) and in 84% of Palestinian textbooks.
 Highly negative characterizations were discerned in 26% of Israeli state school books and 50% of the Palestinian ones.

Harsh critics of PA textbooks give similar examples, but weight them more heavily than IPCRI, the U.S. State Department and The Council for Religious Institutions in the Holy Land do. In addition, the critics point to subtle examples not picked up by these studies.

Dr. Arnon Groiss is perhaps the strongest academic critic. He had in the past conducted independent research of Palestinian, Egyptian, Syrian, Saudi Arabian, Tunisian, and Iranian schoolbooks between 2000 and 2010, and was thus appointed to be a member of the Scientific Advisory Panel for the study from The Council For Religious Institutions in the Holy Land. He criticized the study and its results for the following:
 selection of the Study Material: "highly demonizing pieces were not included, under the pretext that they were not explicit enough", "explicit denial…was not included too"
 categorization methods: "real cases of ignoring the 'other' deliberately without degrading him slipped away from scrutiny", false positive descriptions
 the quality and depth of the analysis: "There is no attempt to study the quotes more deeply and draw conclusions", "the report considers Jihad and martyrdom as values, which is acceptable academically, but it fails to evaluate their impact on the issues of war and peace".
Groiss concluded that "the main question, namely, to what extent is this or that party engaged in actual education for peace, if at all, has not been answered by the report itself."

All in all there seems to be broad agreement that there is continual improvement in the textbooks used by UNRWA—but very strong disagreement about whether the improvement is sufficient. In response to a critical report written in 2009 by former UNRWA general counsel James G. Lindsay, fellow researcher for Washington Institute for Near East Policy John Ging, head of UNRWA Gaza, said: "As for our schools, we use textbooks of the Palestinian Authority. Are they perfect? No, they're not. I can't defend the indefensible."

UNRWA has taken many steps since the year 2000 to supplement the PA curriculum with concepts of human rights, nonviolent conflict resolution, and tolerance. According to the UNRWA website:

We have been delivering human rights education in our schools since 2000 to promote non-violence, healthy communication skills, peaceful conflict resolution, human rights, tolerance, and good citizenship. In May 2012, the Agency endorsed its new Human Rights, Conflict Resolution and Tolerance (HRCRT) Policy to further strengthen human rights education in UNRWA. This policy builds upon past successes, but also draws from international best practices and paves the way to better integrate human rights education in all our schools. The HRCRT Policy reflects the UNRWA mandate of quality education for Palestine refugees and sets out a common approach among all UNRWA schools for the teaching and learning of human rights, conflict resolution and tolerance. The vision of the policy is to "provide human rights education that empowers Palestine refugee students to enjoy and exercise their rights, uphold human rights values, be proud of their Palestinian identity, and contribute positively to their society and the global community."

Relationship with Hamas
In April 2013, Palestinian journalist Hazem Balousha summed up years of tension between UNRWA and Hamas:
Agency in Gaza faces increasing difficulty in carrying out its work, as the Hamas-led government claims some of its activities are not in line with the Strip's Islamic culture and values ...

According to The Guardian, Hamas has in some cases threatened UN staff in Gaza; the former UNRWA chief in Gaza, John Ging, has survived two assassination attempts.

Peter Hansen, UNRWA's former Commissioner-General (1996–2005), caused controversy in Canada in October 2004 when he said in an interview with CBC TV:

Oh I am sure that there are Hamas members on the UNRWA payroll and I don't see that as a crime. Hamas as a political organization does not mean that every member is a militant and we do not do political vetting and exclude people from one persuasion as against another.
We demand of our staff, whatever their political persuasion is, that they behave in accordance with UN standards and norms for neutrality.

Hansen later specified that he had been referring not to active Hamas members, but to Hamas sympathizers within UNRWA. In a letter to the Agency's major donors, he said he was attempting to be honest because UNRWA has over 8,200 employees in the Gaza Strip. Given the 30% support of Hamas in Gaza at the time, and UNRWA's workforce of 11,000 Palestinians, at least some Hamas sympathizers were likely to be among UNRWA's employees. The important thing, he wrote, was that UNRWA's strict rules and regulations ensured that its staff remained impartial UN servants. However, he was retired from United Nations service against his will on 31 March 2005.

James G. Lindsay, a former UNRWA general counsel and fellow researcher for Washington Institute for Near East Policy published a report for WINEP in 2009 in which he criticized UNRWA practices. One of his conclusions was that UNRWA is not ousting terrorists from its ranks:

UNRWA has taken very few steps to detect and eliminate terrorists from the ranks of its staff or its beneficiaries, and no steps at all to prevent members of organizations such as Hamas from joining its staff. UNRWA has no preemployment security checks and does not monitor off-time behavior to ensure compliance with the organization's anti-terror rules. No justification exists for millions of dollars in humanitarian aid going to those who can afford to pay for UNRWA services.

In 2013 Lt. Col. (ret.) Jonathan Dahoah-Halevi, senior researcher of the Middle East and radical Islam at the Jerusalem Center for Public Affairs, asserted that 'the UNRWA workers union has been controlled in practice by Hamas for many years'.

According to The Jerusalem Post and Fox News Hamas won a teachers union election for UN schools in Gaza in 2009. UNRWA has strongly denied this and notes that "Staff elections are conducted on an individual – not party list – basis for unions that handle normal labour relations – not political – issues." In addition, John Ging, the Gaza head of operations, said in a letter dated 29 March 2009 that employees must not "be under the influence of any political party in the conduct of their work."

It has also been claimed that in 2012, the Hamas "Professional List" again won a Staff Union election in UNRWA. The Professional List is led by alleged senior Hamas activist Suheil Al-Hind. More than 9,500 UNRWA employees in the Gaza Strip participated; this represented more than 80% turnout. The professional list won three UNRWA workers groups: the employees', teachers', and services' unions.

Schools
It has been reported that Hamas has interfered with curriculum and textbooks in UNRWA schools.

For example, in 2009 it caused UNRWA to suspend a decision to introduce Holocaust studies in its schools.

One of UNRWA's flagships has been gender-equality and integration. But Hamas militants have firebombed UNRWA mixed-gender summer camps, and in 2013 Hamas passed a law requiring gender segregation in schools for all pupils nine years of age and older in Gaza. The law does not apply to UNRWA schools.

Elhanen Miller, the Arab affairs reporter for The Times of Israel, wrote in February 2014 that Hamas was "bashing" UNRWA's human rights curriculum, saying that it included too many examples and values foreign to Palestinian culture and had too much emphasis on peaceful resistance rather than armed resistance. In this case UNRWA refused to be swayed. Spokesman Chris Gunness:

UNRWA has no plans to change its education programs in Gaza ... human rights are taught in all UNRWA schools from grades 1 through 9, discussing the Universal Declaration of Human Rights.

UNRWA's education system takes as its basis the curriculum taught by the PA and so we use PA textbooks in preparing children in Gaza for public examinations. ... In addition, we enrich our education programs in Gaza with an agreed human rights curriculum which has been developed with the communities we serve: with educationalists, parents groups, teachers associations, staff members and others. We have done our utmost in developing these materials to be sensitive to local values while also being true to the universal values that underpin the work of the United Nations.

However, after a few days, UNRWA consented to temporarily suspending the use of only the books used in grades 7–9 (continuing to use the books used in grades 1–6) pending further discussions.

Camps and sports
Hamas has denounced UNRWA and Ging, accusing them of using their summer camps to corrupt the morals of Palestinian youth. Hamas also advised UNRWA to reexamine its curriculum to ensure its suitability for Palestinian society, due to the mixing of genders at the camps.

In September 2011 it was reported that, under pressure from Hamas, UNRWA has made all its summer camps single-sex.

Hamas has its own network of summer camps and the two organizations are regarded to be vying for influence with Gazan youth. Islamic Jihad has also run summer camps since 2013.

UNRWA did not operate its summer camps for summer 2012 and summer 2014 due to a lack of available funding. Hamas has filled this void and now is the direct provider of summer activities for about 100,000 children and youths.

In 2013, UNRWA canceled its planned marathon in Gaza after Hamas rulers prohibited women from participating in the race.

In 2013, Israeli media outlets aired a video documenting UNRWA-funded summer camps where children are being taught to engage in violence with Israelis. The video airs speakers telling campers "With God's help and our own strength we will wage war. And with education and Jihad we will return to our homes!" A student is also shown on camera describing that "the summer camp teaches us that we have to liberate Palestine."

UNRWA denies that the video shows UNRWA summer camps and instead shows footage of camps that were not operated by UNRWA. Following the release of the film, UNRWA released a statement that read, in part:

UNRWA has conducted a lengthy and detailed investigation into the film and we categorically reject the allegations it contains. The film is grossly misleading and we regret the damage it has caused to UNRWA and the United Nations.

The film-maker concerned has a history of making baseless claims about UNRWA, all of which we have investigated and demonstrated to be patently false. It has long been the practice of the film-maker to show non-UNRWA activities and portray them as activities of UNRWA. He has done this again and we again reject his allegations. Our repeated rejection of his falsehoods is a matter of public record.

The main accusation in the film is that incitement is promoted during UNRWA 'summer camps'. The 'summer camp' shown in the West Bank was not affiliated with or organized by UNRWA. The only UNRWA summer activities actually depicted are those shot in Gaza. However, our investigation of the film has revealed that absolutely nothing anti-Semitic or inflammatory was done or said in the scenes filmed in Gaza.

In addition, those interviewed in the film are presented with captions that identify them as UNRWA staff members. However, only one of those interviewed is an UNRWA staff member. The comment she makes does not violate UNRWA's neutrality policy.

UNRWA is committed to fostering human rights and tolerance, and teaches these values through the curriculum in its schools. UNRWA is one of the few organizations that has implemented human rights and conflict resolution training for millions of Palestine refugee children in the complex political environment of the Middle East for over 12 years.

UNRWA facilities being abused by Hamas militants
In 2003, Israel released to newspapers what the New York Times called a "damning intelligence report". Citing interrogations of suspected militants, the document claims that UNRWA operations being used as a cover for Palestinian terrorists, including smuggling arms in UN ambulances and hosting meetings of Tanzim in UN buildings. UN officials responded, according to the NY Times, by saying that it is Israel that has "lost its objectivity and begun regarding anyone who extends a hand to a Palestinian as an enemy."

The Israel Defense Forces released a video from May 2004, in which armed Palestinian militants carry an injured colleague into an UNRWA ambulance, before boarding with him. The ambulance driver requested that the armed men leave, but was threatened and told to drive to a hospital. UNRWA issued a plea to all parties to respect the neutrality of its ambulances.

On 1 October 2004, Israel again lodged accusations against UNRWA. The video documentation was not convincing, and the Israeli military changed some of its earlier statements and conceded the possibility that the object could have indeed been a stretcher, but did not offer the apology Hansen had demanded.

The Israeli Army circulates footage taken on 29 October 2007 showing three militants firing mortars from UNRWA boys' school in Beit Hanoun, Gaza. The militants were able to enter due to the fact that the school was evacuated at the time because of the war.

According to the former Israeli ambassador to the United Nations Dore Gold:

Although education was one of the fields in which UNRWA was supposed to provide aid, the agency did nothing to alter Palestinian educational texts that glorified violence and continuing war against Israel. This has been found to be false in several US State Department reports such as Brown and PICRI cited above.

On 4 February 2009, UNRWA halted aid shipments into the Gaza Strip after it accused Hamas of breaking into a UN warehouse and stealing tonnes of blankets and food which had been earmarked for needy families. A few days later, the UN resumed aid after the missing supplies had been returned.

On 5 August 2009, the IDF accused Hamas of stealing three ambulances that had just been transferred through Israel to the UNRWA. The UNRWA spokesman denied the claim. A week later, Hamas confirmed it confiscated the ambulances due to bureaucratic reasons. A UNRWA spokesman also confirmed this but soon retracted this admission and denied the incident, even publicizing a photo it claimed was of one its officials with the ambulances.

Al-Fakhura violence

On 7 January 2009, UNRWA officials alleged that the prior day, in the course of the Gaza War, the Israel Defense Forces shelled the area outside a UNRWA school in Jabalya, Gaza, killing more than forty people. The IDF initially claimed it was responding to an attack by Hamas gunman hiding in the compound, but upon reexamination, said that an "errant shell had hit the school." Maxwell Gaylord, the UN humanitarian coordinator, stated that the UN "would like to clarify that the shelling, and all of the fatalities, took place outside rather than inside the school."

UNRWA has consistently rejected the allegation that militants used the Agency's installations during the Gaza war in 2008–2009. These accusations have been published by some media outlets, although they are sometimes retracted. In 2012 when on two occasions, Israel Channel Two TV, the most popular network in Israel apologised and issued a retraction of these allegations.

During the 2014 Israel–Gaza conflict, UNRWA spokesmen reported in July that weapons were found in three vacant UNRWA schools which had been closed for the summer. UNRWA strongly condemned the activity as a "flagrant violation of the inviolability of its premises under international law" and UNRWA staff were withdrawn from the premises. It appears, however, that UNRWA returned weapons to the local government – meaning Hamas.

Even though the claim of the booby-trapped UNRWA clinic proved to be false, it has been repeated on several occasions by vocal UNRWA opponents, including at an official hearing of the U.S. House Committee on Foreign Affairs on 9 September 2014. During the hearing, "Hamas' Benefactors: A Network of Terror", Jonathan Schanzer from the Foundation for Defense of Democracies told the Committee that UNRWA was "allowing for the building of tunnels, these commando tunnels, underneath their facilities in my opinion very much needs to be investigated." It is unclear whether Schanzer knew he was misleading the Committee, though he also repeated the assertion at an event hosted by the Foundation for Defense of Democracies entitled "The Israeli–Palestinian Conflict" on 13 August 2014, where he stated there was "at least one booby-trapped tunnel under one of its facilities."

Social media and incitement
According to UN Watch, at least ten different UNRWA employees used social media in October 2015 to incite Palestinian stabbing and shooting attacks against Israelis, with one calling on Facebook to "stab Zionist dogs". UN secretary-general spokesperson said that more than 90 Facebook pages violating UNRWA social media rules were removed. Some of the posts were made by imposters or former UNRWA employees and some by current UNRWA staff. In addition, an UNRWA spokesperson was quoted in The Forward as saying that staff members had been sanctioned, "including loss of pay" and that remaining allegations were "under assessment". He also noted that "In some cases, we have determined the alleged 'UNRWA staff' are not in fact UNRWA employees or are no longer UNRWA employees."

Investigations and calls for accountability and reform
Many critics of UNRWA, while generally recognizing the importance of its work and the infeasibility of disbanding it, believe it requires more transparency, oversight, and support. Writing in the Middle East Monitor in April 2012, Karen Koning AbuZayd, a former Commissioner-General of the UNRWA (2005–2009), argued that "UNRWA needs support not brickbats". She concluded that:

... even those who scrutinise [UNRWA] most closely and challenge it most severely are those who also ensure that its programmes receive adequate funding. They, like others who view the agency more positively, realise that UNRWA makes a major contribution to stability in the Middle East.

Writing in the Times of Israel on 31 July 2014, David Horovits likewise observed that although Israel has many complaints against UNRWA, it is broadly supportive of the organization not interested in abolishing it. During the article's publication, the 2014 Gaza conflict had resulted in 225,000 displaced persons within Gaza, the vast majority of whom relied on UNRWA for immediate support. Horovitsalso noted that Israel acknowledges UNRWA's close monitoring by Hamas for any alleged pro-Israel bias.

2004 investigation by the United States Congress
The United States government financed a programme of "Operations Support Officers", part of whose job was to make random and unannounced inspections of UNRWA facilities to ensure their sanctity from militant operations. In 2004 the U.S. Congress asked the General Accounting Office to investigate media claims that government funding given to UNRWA had been used to support individuals involved in militant activities. During its investigation, the GAO discovered several irregularities in its processing and employment history.

James G. Lindsay
On the basis of his 2009 analyses for WINEP, referred to in previous sections, former UNRWA general-counsel James G. Lindsay and fellow researcher for Washington Institute for Near East Policy made the following suggestions for improvement:
UNRWA should make the following operational changes: halt its one-sided political statements and limit itself to comments on humanitarian issues; take additional steps to ensure the agency is not employing or providing benefits to terrorists and criminals; and allow the UN Educational, Scientific and Cultural Organization (UNESCO), or some other neutral entity, to provide balanced and discrimination-free textbooks for UNRWA schools.

Andrew Whitley, director of the UNRWA representative office at UN headquarters in New York, said: "The agency is disappointed by the findings of the study, found it to be tendentious and partial, and regrets in particular the narrow range of sources used".

UNRWA's Jerusalem spokesone Chris Gunness stated that UNRWA rejects Lindsay's report and its findings and claimed that the study was inaccurate and misleading, since it "makes selective use of source material and fails to paint a truthful portrait of UNRWA and its operations today".

In response to the criticism of his report from UNRWA, Lindsay writes:

Canadian redirection of funds from UNRWA to specific PA projects
In January 2010, the Government of Canada announced that it was redirecting aid previously earmarked to UNRWA "to specific projects in the Palestinian Authority that will ensure accountability and foster democracy in the PA." Victor Toews, the president of Canada's Treasury Board, stated, "Overall, Canada is not reducing the amount of money given to the PA, but it is now being redirected in accordance with Canadian values. This will ensure accountability and foster democracy in the PA." Previously, Canada provided UNRWA with 11 percent of its budget at $10 million (Canadian) annually. The decision came despite positive internal evaluations of the Agency by CIDA officials. The Canadian decision put it very much at odds with the US and EU, which maintained or increased their levels of funding. Some suggested that the decision also cost Canada international support in its failed October 2010 effort to obtain a seat on the UN Security Council.

Documents obtained from the Canadian International Development Agency revealed that even the government of Israel opposed the Canadian move, and had asked Ottawa to resume contributions to UNRWA's General Fund.

UNRWA Reform Initiative
An initiative to reform UNRWA was announced by the Center for Near East Policy Research in March 2014.

The Center carries out research and (through its "Israel Resource News Agency") investigative journalism and research in cooperation with a wide variety of organisations and researchers, such as The Middle East Forum, which has published an entire issue of Middle East Quarterly discussing the challenges facing UNRWA.

The main thrust of the UNRWA Reform Initiative is to present documentation of problems with UNRWA to sponsor nations and organisations with the aim of increasing sponsor demands for accountability. UNRWA has stated on multiple occasions that the head of this initiative, David Bedein, fabricates the information he publishes.

2014 call for U.S. investigation
In August 2014, several U.S. Senators demanded an impartial investigation into UNRWA's alleged participation in the 2014 Gaza-Israel conflict, accusing UNRWA of being complicit with Hamas.

... While the letter does not call on the State Department to cut aid, the senators write that the American taxpayers "deserve to know if UNRWA is fulfilling its mission or taking sides in this tragic conflict."
... Responding to the letter, a State Department spokesman said that the UN is taking "proactive steps to address this problem," including deploying munitions experts to the strip in search of more weapons caches.
"The international community cannot accept a situation where the United Nations– its facilities, staff, and those it is protecting — are used as shields for militants and terrorist groups," State Department spokesone Edgar Vasquez told The Jerusalem Post. "We remain in intensive consultations with UN leadership about the UN's response."
...
"There are few good solutions given the exceptionally difficult situation in Gaza," Vasquez continued, "but nonetheless we are in contact with the United Nations, other UNRWA donors, and concerned parties – including Israel – on identifying better options for protecting the neutrality of UN facilities and ensuring that weapons discovered are handled appropriately and do not find their way back to Hamas or other terrorist groups."

U.S. ends funding 2018
Citing a "failure to mobilize adequate and appropriate burden sharing," the Trump administration stopped funding UNRWA, calling its fundamental business model and fiscal practices "simply unsustainable". Secretary Pompeo maintained that "most Palestinians under UNRWA's jurisdiction aren't refugees, and UNRWA is a hurdle to peace."

EU stops funding 2021 
On September 2021, the European Parliament’s Budgetary Control Committee approved withholding 20 million Euros in aid to UNRWA if immediate changes to UNRWA's education curriculum are not made. According to the resolution, the Parliament “is concerned about the hate speech and violence taught in Palestinian school textbooks and used in schools by UNRWA... [and] insists that UNRWA acts in full transparency... to ensure that content adheres to UN values and does not encourage hatred.”

Relations with Israel
After Israel captured the West Bank and Gaza in the June 1967 Six-Day War, it requested that the UNRWA continue its operations there, which it would facilitate. Since then the relationship has been characterized by two-state advocate Baruch Spiegel, as "an uneasy marriage of convenience between two unlikely bedfellows that have helped perpetuate the problem both have allegedly sought to resolve."

Immediately following the Six-Day War, on 14 June UNRWA Commissioner-General Dr. Lawrence Michelmore and Political Advisor to the Israeli Foreign Minister Michael Comay exchanged letters that has since served as much of the basis for the relationship between Israel and UNRWA. Commonly referred to the Comay-Michelmore Exchange of Letters, the initial letter from Michelmore reiterates a verbal conversation between the two, stating that:

at the request of the Israel Government, UNRWA would continue its assistance to the Palestine refugees, with the full co-operation of the Israel authorities, in the West Bank and Gaza Strip areas. For its part, the Israel Government will facilitate the task of UNRWA to the best of its ability, subject only to regulations or arrangements which may be necessitated by considerations of military security. 

In his responding letter, Comay wrote:
I agree that your letter and this reply constitute a provisional agreement between UNRWA and the Government of Israel, to remain in force until replaced or cancelled.UNRWA has been criticised by the Israeli government and politicians for alleged involvement with Palestinian militant groups, such as Hamas. Israel has stated that Peter Hansen, UNRWA's former Commissioner-General (1996–2005) "consistently adopted a trenchant anti-Israel line" which resulted in biased and exaggerated reports against Israel.

UNRWA has also lodged complaints, for example:

Al-Aqsa Intifada 2000 – allegations of Israeli interference with UNRWA operations
During the Al-Aqsa Intifada, which started in late 2000, UNRWA often complained that Israeli road closures, curfews and checkpoints in the West Bank and Gaza have interfered with its ability to carry out its humanitarian mandate. The Agency has also complained that large-scale house demolitions in the Gaza Strip have leftover 30,000 people homeless. Israel justifies the demolitions as anti-terror measures.

November 2002 allegation that an Israeli sniper killed UNRWA employee
In November 2002 Iain Hook, a British employee of UNRWA, was shot and killed by an IDF sniper while working in the Jenin refugee camp, during an operation to locate a Palestinian militant suspected of masterminding a suicide bombing that killed 14 people earlier in 2002. Peter Hansen, head of UNRWA at the time criticized the killing: "Israeli snipers had sights. They would have known who the two internationals (non-Palestinians) were. They did not dress like Palestinians."

Death of UNRWA Staff Member in Kalandia Refugee Camp
In August 2013, UNRWA released a statement that accused Israel of killing one of its staff members and injuring another in the Kalandia refugee camp during a raid. According to the release from 26 August 2013, "UNRWA deeply regrets to confirm that one of its staff members, a 34-year-old father of four, was shot dead by Israeli forces and killed instantly in an operation in Kalandia refugee camp in the West Bank at approximately seven o'clock this morning. Credible reports say that he was on his way to work and was not engaged in any violent activity. He was shot in the chest. Another UNRWA staff member, a sanitation laborer, was shot in the leg during the same operation and is in a stable condition."

2014 Israel–Gaza conflict

During the 2014 Israel–Gaza conflict, there were many accusations by Israel and many rebuttals by UNRWA. For example, Israel's Channel 2 claimed in a report that an UNRWA ambulance was used to transport militants. It later retracted that claim, after being confronted with "incontrovertible evidence", in the words of UNRWA.

Israel damaged or destroyed a number of UNRWA facilities claiming that they were used for war purposes and thus legitimate targets. According to a UN report, Israel struck seven Gaza shelters, which led to at least 44 Palestinians killed and at least 227 injured. It also said Palestinian groups stored weapons in three schools and likely fired rockets from two of them. UN Sec Gen Ban Ki Moon condemned the use of shelters as a weapons depot.

UNRWA schools and personnel were in the line of fire during the war, even as 290,000 people were staying in UNRWA schools being used as shelters.

During one of the many ceasefires in the war, UNRWA announced nine UNRWA staff members were killed in Israeli shelling of shelters.

2017 Calls for dismantlement, following tunnel under schools
In June 2017, UNRWA employees discovered a tunnel running underneath the Maghazi Elementary Boys A&B School and the Maghazi Preparatory Boys School. According to UNRWA's spokesperson, the tunnel had no entry points in the school premise, but runs underneath the school. UNRWA stated it intended to seal the tunnel, and that is protested to Hamas. Hamas denied it was involved, and requested clarifications from other armed factions that denied involvement as well.

Following the tunnel discovery, Israel's prime minister Benjamin Netanyahu has stated that UNRWA should be dismantled and reincorporated in other UN agencies. In response UNRWA's spokesperson said only the United Nations General Assembly could change UNRWA's mandate, and further stated in Hebrew on Israeli radio that if "UNRWA is gone" from Gaza that "two million people will turn into IS (Islamic State) supporters".

The peace initiative between Israel and Palestine promoted by the Trump Administration, and overseen by Jared Kushner, advocated the winding down of UNRWA through a campaign to disrupt it, and aims to strip Palestinians of their refugee status, according to emails leaked to Foreign Policy magazine. According to Kushner UNRWA "perpetuates a status quo, is corrupt, inefficient and doesn't help peace". Monies to UNRWA would be rechanneled to Arab countries in the area in the expectation that they would eventually absorb the Palestinian refugees resident in their states. Both Kushner and Nikki Haley propose a cut off of U.S. funding for the organization, a proposal opposed by the State Department, the Pentagon, and the U.S. intelligence community, on the grounds that any such move would only fuel violence in the Middle East.

2020 alleged undermining of UNRWA by Israel and the U.S.

In January 2020, UNRWA said that in East Jerusalem, Israel was building schools and institutions "to compete" with UNRWA and stop it from operating there. The same statement had initially alleged that Israel and the United States were "advocating against funding UNRWA in the European parliaments and elsewhere," later clarifying it was referring to pro-Israel groups. The agency also reaffirmed that its mandate includes East Jerusalem.

See also
 2014 Israel–Gaza conflict
 Palestine and the United Nations
 Israeli–Palestinian conflict
 List of Directors and Commissioners-General of the United Nations Relief and Works Agency for Palestine Refugees in the Near East
 Nahr al-Bared
 Palestine refugee
 Palestinian people
 Taylor Force Act
 Textbooks in the Israeli–Palestinian conflict
 United Nations Fact Finding Mission on the Gaza Conflict

Notes

References

Bibliography

External links
 
 UNRWA Facebook profile
 UNRWA Twitter profile
 UNRWA YouTube channel
 UNRWA in Syria
 American Friends of UNRWA
 UNRWA Spanish Committee
 Collection of relevant documents
 United States GAO report on UNRWA (pdf)

U.S. Committee for Refugees and Immigrants' Campaign to End Refugee Warehousing in refugee camps around the world, people are confined to their settlement and denied their basic rights.
Israel Feuds With Agency Set Up to Aid Palestinians (New York Times: 18 October 2004)
Fixing UNRWA: Repairing the UN's Troubled System of Aid to Palestinian Refugees (By James G. Lindsay, Washington Institute for Near East Policy: January 2009)

Arab–Israeli conflict

United Nations operations in the Middle East
United Nations General Assembly subsidiary organs
History of the Palestinian refugees
Palestinian refugees
Organizations established in 1949